Heelis is the central office of the National Trust, in Swindon, Wiltshire, England. Heelis was the married name of Beatrix Potter, one of the key figures in the early history of the National Trust.

It was built in 2005 by Feilden Clegg Bradley Studios. It is considered one of the greenest office buildings in England, incorporating silent, natural ventilation and open-plan meeting spaces.

Gallery

References

External links 
 Heelis at nationaltrust.org.uk
National Trust properties in Wiltshire
Buildings and structures in Swindon
2005 establishments in England
Office buildings completed in 2005